Mahale Mountains National Park lies on the eastern shore of Lake Tanganyika in Uvinza District of Kigoma Region, Tanzania. Named after the Mahale Mountains range that is within its borders, the park has several unusual characteristics. First, it is one of only two protected areas for chimpanzees in the country. (The other is nearby Gombe Stream National Park made famous by the researcher Jane Goodall.) Mahale Mountains National Park harbours the largest known population of eastern chimpanzees and due to its size and remoteness, the chimpanzees flourish. It also a place where chimpanzees and lions co-exist. Another unusual feature of the park is that it is one of the very few in Africa that must be experienced by foot. There are no roads or other infrastructure within the park boundaries, and the only way in and out of the park is via boat on the lake.

The Mahale mountains were traditionally inhabited by the Batongwe and Holoholo peoples, with populations in 1987 of 22,000 and 12,500 respectively.
When the Mahale Mountains Wildlife Research Center was established in 1979, the people were forcefully evicted from the mountains to make way for the park, which opened in 1985 despite the people had been highly attuned to the natural environment, living with virtually no impact on the ecology.

References

External links

Mahale Mountains National Park Official website (in English)

National parks of Tanzania
Geography of Kigoma Region
Miombo
Protected areas established in 1985
1985 establishments in Tanzania
Tourist attractions in the Kigoma Region
Important Bird Areas of Tanzania
Albertine Rift montane forests
Central Zambezian miombo woodlands